Santi Gioacchino ed Anna al Tuscolano is a church in Rome. The church is dedicated to Saints Joachim and Anne, parents of the Virgin Mary.

On 28 June 1988, this church was erected as a cardinal's title. The first two cardinal priests to hold title to this church were Hans Hermann Groer, O.S.B. and Keith O'Brien. Each of these cardinals was implicated in sexual scandals and renounced his privileges as cardinal. The title has been held by Toribio Ticona Porco since 28 June 2018.

Cardinal-priests 
Hans Hermann Groer, OSB (28 June 1988 – 24 March 2003)
Keith O'Brien (21 October 2003 – 19 March 2018)
Toribio Ticona Porco (28 June 2018 – present)

References

Gioacchino e Anna al Tuscolano
Gioacchino e Anna al Tuscolano